Colby Mountain may refer to:

Colby Mountain (Tehama County, California)
Colby Mountain (Tuolumne County, California)